The 2020 Dutch Athletics Championships was the national championship in outdoor track and field for the Netherlands. It was held 29–30 August 2020 at the Sportpark Maarschalkerweerd in Utrecht. It was organised by local organisations AV Phoenix and U-track. The competition was originally scheduled earlier in the year, and to include qualification for the 2020 European Athletics Championships, but the events were delayed due to the COVID-19 pandemic. This necessitated a change of location and events were carried out without an audience. The 10,000 metres races were held separately at the Golden Spike Leiden meet on 19 September.

Results

Men

Women

References

Results
 Results from Atletiek.nu
 Results of 10,000 metres from Atletiek.nu

External links 
 Official website of the Royal Dutch Athletics Federation 

2020
Dutch Athletics Championships
Dutch Championships
Athletics Championships
Sports competitions in Utrecht (city)
Dutch Athletics Championships, 2020